The West Asia Basketball Association (WABA) is a subzone of FIBA Asia, consisting of countries from West Asia. The WABA Champions Cup, a professional men's tournament, is a top level club competition run by the WABA.

Member nations

National tournaments

WABA Championship 

The WABA Championship is a tournament between the national men's basketball teams of the West Asian region. It was first held in Beirut in 1999, and the intention was to keep it once a year thereafter. Despite several years of intermittency, the tournament is now back to its annual format as intended. It serves as the West Asian qualifying tournament for the FIBA Asia Cup and FIBA Asia Challenge.

Club tournaments

WABA Champions Cup

References

External links 
 WABA Basketball Men

Basketball governing bodies in Asia
WABA Championship